Lineville–Clio Community School District (L-C) was a school district headquartered in Lineville, Iowa, United States. It served Lineville and Clio.

Its schools included Lineville Elementary School and Lineville High School.

History
The district originated from a school built in Lineville in 1850. The ACL district, which had schools in Allerton and Lineville, formed with the consolidation of Clio, Lineville, and Allerton school districts, occurring between 1962 and 1966. Allerton de-merged from ACL and merged into the Wayne Community School District in 1967. The name was changed from ACL to Lineville–Clio on July 1, 1987.

In 1995 the district had 115 students, making it the school district in the state with the lowest enrollment, and sixteen faculty members who worked full time.

The final elementary school building of the district opened in 2004.

The district decided to wind down in 2010, with students moved to Wayne Community School District and/or Mormon Trail Community School District. Lineville Elementary was not closed at that time. The Lineville–Clio merger with Wayne was effective July 1, 2011.

Operations
In 1995, it had an agreement with the Fremont Community School District and the Russell Community School District to have a single superintendent.

Campus
Its school building was constructed of brick circa 1915. In 1995 Mark Siebert of the Des Moines Register described the school building as "decaying".

Curriculum
In 1995, Lineville-Clio students taking Spanish classes did so at the North Mercer School District in Mercer, Missouri.

Athletics
In 1995, students played on athletic teams at Mormon Trail High School in Humeston, Iowa, including its American football and volleyball teams.

References

Further reading

External links
 
 

Defunct school districts in Iowa
Education in Wayne County, Iowa
School districts disestablished in 2011
2011 disestablishments in Iowa
1850 establishments in Iowa
School districts established in 1850